Hayagriva Madhava Temple is situated on the Monikut hill. Which is around 30 km to west of Guwahati. The Kalika Purana composed in the 11th century CE in Kamarupa talks about the origin of this form of Vishnu and his final establishment in the hill of Monikut, where the present temple is located. The present temple structure was constructed by the King Raghudeva Narayan in 1583. According to some historians the King of Pala dynasty constructed it in 10th century. It is a stone temple and it enshrines an image of Hayagriva Madhava. Some Buddhists believe that the Hayagriva Madhava temple, best known in the group of Hindu temples, is where the Buddha attained Nirvana. At this imposing temple, the presiding deity is Vishnu, worshipped in the sanctum sanctorum as an idol carved of black stone. Four other stone idols are also in worship as subsidiary deities. 

A most striking feature of the temple is the continuous row of elephants carved on the lowest level of the temple walls - a structure akin to the stone cut temple of Ellora. The outer walls of the shrine is also covered with relief figures of the ten incarnations of Vishnu, devotees in procession and episodic scenes from the Ramayana and the Mahabharata. There is a big pond known as Madhab Pukhuri near the temple. Doul, Bihu and Janmastami festivals are celebrated every year in the temple. 

Sayani, the first wife of Kalia Bhomora Borphukan donated a family of paiks and also a plot of land for their maintenance to the Hayagriva Madhava temple during the reign of Ahom king Kamaleswar Singha. The lamps in the sanctum sanctorum are never put off (akhanda deep) ever. Oil flows into the big earthen lamps through a simple tube connected to the oil tin.

References

Hindu temples in Assam
Hindu temples in Kamrup district